The Great Believers is a historical fiction novel by Rebecca Makkai, published June 4, 2018 by Penguin Books. 

The book is a Carnegie Medal winner, National Book Award finalist, Stonewall Book Award winner, and Pulitzer Prize finalist.

Reception 
The Great Believers received starred reviews from Kirkus, Booklist, Publishers Weekly, and Shelf Awareness, as well as a positive review from Library Journal, The New York Times Book Review, The Guardian, Los Angeles Review of Books, Entertainment Weekly, The Star Tribune, The Kenyon Review, NPR, The San Francisco Chronicle, The Boston Globe, and Lambda Literary, among others.

Writing for the Los Angeles Times, Dan López called The Great Believers "a heartbreaking meditation on AIDS, loss, and friendship." Kirkus said the book was "as compulsively readable as it is thoughtful and moving." 

NPR's Celia McGee noted, "Makkai’s writing isn’t the kind that calls attention to itself, allowing the people, emotions, personal incidents and public occurrences of her book to take shape with the force of urgency and the authentic, the grievousness of deceit—by lovers, by families, by hope—and the generosity of romance, sorrow, growth and wonder. She unleashes a mathematics as compelling as her attention to the contradictions within personalities."

Newsday's Tim Murphy wrote that Makkai "has, in fact, done a superb job of capturing a group of friends in a particular time and place with humor and compassion. Conversations among her gay male characters feel very real — not too flamboyant, not too serious, always morbidly witty. It's hard not to get drawn into this circle of promising young men as they face their brutally premature extinction."

Kirkus named The Great Believers one of the best books of the year.

References 

Novels set in the 1980s
Novels set in Chicago
Novels set in Wisconsin
Novels set in Paris
Novels about HIV/AIDS
Stonewall Book Award-winning works
2018 novels